Iogeton is a monotypic genus of flowering plants in the family Asteraceae.

It only contains one known species, Iogeton nowickeanus, known only from San Blas Province in Panamá.

The genus name of Iogeton is in reference to the Greek mythology character of Io (a goddess associated with rivers) and -geton (the Greek word meaning neighbour) and which is because the plant is found near streams.

References

Heliantheae
Monotypic Asteraceae genera
Flora of Panama